Granma is the yacht that was used to transport 82 fighters of the Cuban Revolution from Mexico to Cuba in November 1956 for the purpose of overthrowing the regime of Fulgencio Batista. The 60-foot (18 m) diesel-powered cabin cruiser was built in 1943 by Wheeler Shipbuilding of Brooklyn, New York, as a light armored target practice boat, US Navy C-1994 and modified postwar to accommodate 12 people. "Granma", in English, is an affectionate term for a grandmother; the yacht is said to have been named for the previous owner's grandmother.

Background

Exile of Moncada attackers

Striking their first blow against the Batista government, Fidel and Raúl Castro gathered 70 fighters and planned a multi-pronged attack on several military installations. On 26 July 1953, the rebels attacked the Moncada Barracks in Santiago and the barracks in Bayamo, only to be decisively defeated by the far more numerous government soldiers. It was hoped that the staged attack would spark a nationwide revolt against Batista's government. After an hour of fighting most of the rebels and their leader fled to the mountains. The exact number of rebels killed in the battle is debatable; however, in his autobiography, Fidel Castro claimed that nine were killed in the fighting, and an additional 56 were executed after being captured by the Batista government. Due to the government's large number of men, Hunt revised the number to be around 60 members taking the opportunity to flee to the mountains along with Castro. Among the dead was Abel Santamaría, Castro's second-in-command, who was imprisoned, tortured, and executed on the same day as the attack.

Numerous key Movement revolutionaries, including the Castro brothers, were captured shortly afterwards. In a highly political trial, Fidel spoke for nearly four hours in his defense, ending with the words "Condemn me, it does not matter. History will absolve me." Castro's defense was based on nationalism, the representation and beneficial programs for the non-elite Cubans, and his patriotism and justice for the Cuban community. Fidel was sentenced to 15 years in the Presidio Modelo prison, located on Isla de Pinos, while Raúl was sentenced to 13 years. However, in 1955, under broad political pressure, the Batista government freed all political prisoners in Cuba, including the Moncada attackers. Fidel's Jesuit childhood teachers succeeded in persuading Batista to include Fidel and Raúl in the release.

Conception
When Fidel Castro left Cuba for exile in Mexico he quickly met with Spanish Civil War veteran Alberto Bayo. Castro informed Bayo he had a plan to invade Cuba but at the moment had no money for weapons or a single volunteered soldier. Despite the lack of resources Bayo decided to assist in Castro's plan reasoning giving military advice would cost him nothing. With time Fidel would be joined by his brother Raul Castro, his old comrade Antonio "Ñico" López. Lopez would bring Raul Castro to the nearby hospital where an exiled Che Guevara was working as a doctor. Guevara, who had previously met Lopez in Guatemala was invited to meet with Fidel Castro by Lopez. The Castro brothers, Lopez, and Guevara were to be the first volunteers for the expediton. On the evening of July 8, 1954 Guevara and Fidel Castro would meet in the home of Maria Antonia Gonzalez. The apartment would later become a headquarters for the rebels. With time Castro would observe he had little money for his plans and in October would travel to New Jersey and Miami to raise money from Cuban exiles for his invasion.

Preparations
The yacht was purchased on October 10, 1956, for MX$50,000 (US$15,000) from the United States-based Schuylkill Products Company, Inc., by a Mexican citizen—said to be Mexico City gun dealer Antonio "The Friend" del Conde—secretly representing Fidel Castro.
The builder, Wheeler Shipbuiding, then of Brooklyn, New York, now of Chapel Hill, North Carolina, also built Hemingway's Pilar. It is still unknown who removed the light armor and expanded the cabin postwar to convert the navy training boat into a civilian yacht.
Castro's 26th of July Movement had attempted to purchase a Catalina flying boat maritime aircraft, or a US naval crash rescue boat for the purpose of crossing the Gulf of Mexico to Cuba, but their efforts had been thwarted by lack of funds. The money to purchase Granma had been raised in the US state of Florida by former President of Cuba Carlos Prío Socarrás and Teresa Casuso Morín.

Shortly after midnight on November 25, 1956, in the Mexican port of Tuxpan, Veracruz, Granma was surreptitiously boarded by 82 members of the 26th of July movement including their leader, Fidel Castro, his brother, Raúl Castro, Che Guevara, and Camilo Cienfuegos. The group—who later came to be known collectively as los expedicionarios del yate Granma (the Granma yacht expeditioners)—then set out from Tuxpan at 2 a.m. After a series of vicissitudes and misadventures, including diminishing supplies, sea-sickness, and the near-foundering of their heavily laden and leaking craft, they disembarked on December 2 on the Playa Las Coloradas, municipality of Niquero, in modern Granma Province (after the vessel), formerly part of the larger Oriente Province. Granma was piloted by Norberto Collado Abreu, a World War II Cuban Navy veteran and ally of Castro.  The location was chosen to emulate the voyage of national hero José Martí, who had landed in the same region 61 years earlier during the wars of independence from Spanish colonial rule.

Operation

Santiago de Cuba uprising
An uprising organized by the 26th of July movement and planned by Haydée Santamaría, Celia Sánchez, and Frank País occurred in Santiago de Cuba. It was planned in occurrence with the landing of the Granma. The uprising was happened on November 30 but was quickly crushed by police. The Granma itself wouldn't arrive in Cuba until days later on December 2. It was made two days late due to bad weather on the voyage to Cuba.

Granma landing
We reached solid ground, lost, stumbling along like so many shadows or ghosts marching in response to some obscure psychic impulse. We had been through seven days of constant hunger and sickness during the sea crossing, topped by three still more terrible days on land. Exactly 10 days after our departure from Mexico, during the early morning hours of December 5, following a night-long march interrupted by fainting and frequent rest periods, we reached a spot paradoxically known as Alegría de Pío (Rejoicing of the Pious). –Che Guevara

Batista correctly predicted that the landing would take place, and his troops were ready. Consequentially, the landing party was bombarded by helicopters and airplanes soon after landing. Since the terrain on the coastline provided little cover, the party was an easy target. Many casualties ensued, most of them during battle at  further inland. The survivors continued to the foot of Pico Turquino in the Sierra Maestra to carry out guerilla war.

Initially, Batista did not know who exactly were among the casualties, and international media widely reported that Fidel had died. This was, however, not the case. Of the 82, around 21 had survived. According to the most credible version, the survivors were Fidel, Raúl, Guevara, Armando Rodríguez, Ramiro Valdés, Universo Sánchez, Efigenio Ameijeiras, René Rodríguez, Camilo Cienfuegos, Juan Almeida Bosque, Calixto García, Calixto Morales, Reinaldo Benítez, Julio Díaz, Luis Crespo Cabrera, Rafael Chao, José Morán, Carlos Bermúdez, and Fransisco González. All others had been either killed, captured, or left behind.

Granma yacht expeditioners
The 82 expeditioners were:

 Fidel Castro
 
 
 José Smith Comas
 Juan Almeida Bosque
 Raúl Castro
 Pablo Díaz
 Félix Elmuza
 Armando Huau
 Che Guevara
 Antonio López
 Teniente Jesús Reyes
 Cándido González
 Onelio Pino
 Roberto Roque
 
 Mario Hidalgo
 César Gómez
 Rolando Moya
 Horacio Rodríguez
 José Ponce Díaz
 José Ramón Martínez
 Fernando Sánchez-Amaya
 Arturo Chaumont
 Norberto Collado
  
 Julio Díaz
 René Bedia
 Evaristo Montes de Oca
 Esteban Sotolongo
 Andrés Luján
 José Fuentes
 Pablo Hurtado
 Emilio Albentosa
 Luis Crespo
 Rafael Chao
 Ernesto Fernández
 Armando Mestre
 Miguel Cabañas
 Eduardo Reyes
 Humberto Lamothe
 Santiago Hirzel
 Enrique Cuélez
 
 Manuel Echevarría
 Fransisco González
 Mario Fuentes
 Noelio Capote
 Raúl Suárez
 Gabriel Gil
 Luis Arcos
 Alfonso Guillén Zelaya
 Miguel Saavedra
 Pedro Sotto
 Arsenio García
 Israel Cabrera
 Carlos Bermúdez
 Antonio Darío López
 Oscar Rodríguez
 Camilo Cienfuegos
 Gilberto García
 René Reiné
 
 Norberto Godoy
 Enrique Cámara
 Raúl Díaz
 Armando Rodríguez
 Calixto García
 Calixto Morales
 Reinaldo Benítez
 René Rodríguez
 Jesús Gómez
 Francisco Chicola
 Universo Sánchez
 Efigenio Ameijeiras
 Ramiro Valdés
 Tomás Royo
 Arnaldo Pérez
 
 Rolando Santana
 Ramón Mejias
 José Morán

Legacy

Soon after the revolutionary forces triumphed on January 1, 1959, the cabin cruiser was transferred to Havana Bay. Norberto Collado Abreu, who had served as main helmsman for the 1956 voyage, received the job of guarding and preserving the yacht.

Since 1976, the yacht has been on permanent display in a glass enclosure at the Granma Memorial adjacent to the Museum of the Revolution in Havana. A portion of old Oriente Province, where the expedition made landfall, was renamed Granma Province in honor of the vessel. UNESCO has declared the Landing of the Granma National Park—established at the location (Playa Las Coloradas)—a World Heritage Site for its natural habitat.

Cuba celebrates December 2 as the Day of the Cuban Armed Forces, and a replica has also been paraded at state functions to commemorate the original voyage. In further tribute, the official newspaper of the Central Committee of the Cuban Communist Party has been called Granma. The name of the vessel became an icon for Cuban communism.

References

Works cited

External links

 Wheeler Yachts Home Page
 Che Guevara's account of the Granma's voyage
 Fidel Castro recalls the Granma crossing
 Landing of the Granma on historyofcuba.com
 The Voyage of the Granma
 Che Describes his Departure to Cuba from Mexico Aboard the Granma

Motor yachts
Cuban Revolution
Museum ships in Cuba
Che Guevara